Charles Frossard may refer to:

Charles Auguste Frossard (1807–1875), French general
Sir Charles Frossard (Bailiff), (1922–2012), Bailiff of Guernsey, 1982–1992